Acton Green is a residential neighbourhood in Chiswick and the London Borough of Ealing, in West London, England. It is named for the nearby Acton Green common. It was once home to many small laundries and was accordingly known as "Soapsuds Island".

History

The public parkland of Acton Green common adjoins Chiswick Back Common; before they were divided by the railway embankment for the District and Piccadilly lines, both were part of the English Civil War battlefield of the Battle of Turnham Green.

South Acton, especially the Acton Green district, was once famous for its laundries, and was known as "Soapsuds island". There were some 60 laundries in 1873, rising to over 170 in 1890, most of the washing being done by hand. The 1901 census recorded as laundry workers 568 men and 2,448 women. The number of laundries fell to 50 in 1956, by then all automated: still the largest concentration of such businesses in Britain at that time. The business supported light industries that produced laundry requisites, including baskets, laundry hampers, mangles, washing machines, tubs, and wringers.

Facing the east of the common is St Michael and All Angels, Bedford Park; it and The Tabard Inn facing it across Bath Road, were built in 1880. The 1894 Ordnance Survey map shows Acton Green bounded to the west by railway lines, and to the east by the boundary of Bedford Park; at that time, both the west of Bedford Park and the east of Acton Green consisted of orchards.

Housing

Most of the housing of Acton Green is to the northwest of the common; to its east is the Bedford Park area, developed speculatively as a place for artists at the same time as St Michael's and The Tabard. There were formerly numerous small shops in the centre of Acton Green on Cunnington Street and Kingswood Road. These included confectioners, fish and chip shops, grocers, and off-licences. The area also held a variety of schools, now all closed.

St Alban's Church

On the north side of the common, facing South Parade, is the red-brick with stone facings neo-Gothic Victorian era St Alban's Church, Acton Green by Edward Monson Jr; it was opened in 1888. It is described as the focus of the Acton Green Conservation area; the church building is Grade II listed. The nearby vicarage uses the same red brick and stone window surrounds and mullions.

West side of the common

Facing the west of the common are the mansion flats of the locally listed four-storey red brick Fairlawn Court, built around 1900. Just to its north are the loft apartments of Chiswick Green Studios, a "modish conversion" of a group of industrial buildings. The buildings from 1930 and 1950 had been the military electronics components factory of Evershed & Vignoles. They were converted to form apartments, including new penthouses through the addition of a curved roof; a third building retained only the original frame and was made into cheaper "loft style" apartments.

Public houses

Duke of Sussex

Nearby, facing the north of the common is the 1898 Duke of Sussex public house; it replaced an earlier beerhouse founded by 1842. The current "elaborately decorated" building was designed by the pub architects Shoebridge & Rising, and is Grade II listed. It has two storeys, with dormer windows for the attic and cellars below. The main front faces east on to Beaconsfield Road, with three bays, two of them with dormers, separated by a small half-round Diocletian window, and the third an extension to house the kitchens and staircase. The walls are covered in white stucco, with the first storey hung with flat red tiles. The first storey and attic windows below the dormers are "Ipswich oriels" under ornamental cornices. The ground floor bar area has big arched windows, and an elaborate corner doorway; the doorway to the north is adorned with ornamental ironwork. Parts of the original interior partitioning survive, providing "an unusually rich, turn-of-the-century pub interior".

Other

On the corner of Bollo Lane, which marks the western edge of the area, and Montgomery Road is the Bollo, a gastropub. It opened soon after 1900 as 'The Railway Hotel', complete with a painting of a railway locomotive on the outside wall. It then became in turn 'The Railway Tavern', 'The Orange Kipper' (1988), 'The Bollo House', and finally the Bollo.

On the corner of Evershed Walk and Acton Lane is The Swan, opened in 1871 by the Phoenix Brewery of Latimer Road in what had been a beerhouse owned by James Brown. Its exterior featured in a 1980s television situation comedy. It is described by Harden's guide as a "lovely panelled pub" with attractive garden, serving good food.

Transport
Chiswick Park tube station on the District line, and Turnham Green tube station on the District and Picadilly lines, are at the western and eastern ends of Acton Green common.

South Acton is the nearest National Rail station and is on the North London Line. Chiswick railway station is the closest for services into London Waterloo.

The London Buses route 94 to Piccadilly Circus terminates at the northwestern corner of Acton Green common.

References

Acton, London
Areas of London
Common land in London
Districts of the London Borough of Ealing